The Fourth Military Region is a military region of Armed Forces of Yemen. Its headquarters locates in Aden city, the interim capital of Yemen.

History 
The 4th region was established in 2013 as part of the military restructuring by former president Abdrabbuh Mansur Hadi who issued a republication decree to divide the military field into seven regions, including the Fourth Military Region. The region is headquartered in Aden city and supervises the military units in Aden, Taiz, Lahj, Abyan, and al-Dhale Governorates.

Structure 
The region consists of 25 military units and brigades, including; 33rd, 31st, 35th. 22nd and Armored Brigade, 45th, 115, 119, and 111 Infantry Brigades.

Leadership 

 Major General Mahmoud al-Subaihi (10 April 2013–  7 November 2014)
 Major General Ali Naser Hadi (7 November 2014– 6 May 2015)
 Major General Saif Saleh al-Dhali (6 May 2015– 6 July 2015)
 Major General  Ahmed Saif al-Yafie ( 6 July 2015– November 2016)
 Major General Fadhel Hassan (22 November 2016– incumbent)

See also 

 First Military Region
 2nd Military Region (Yemen)
 3rd Military Region (Yemen)

References 

Military regions of Yemen
Military of Yemen
Ministry of Defense (Yemen)
2013 establishments in Yemen